Protease, serine, 2 (trypsin 2) is a protein that in humans is encoded by the PRSS2 gene.

Function 

This gene encodes a trypsinogen, which is a member of the trypsin family of serine proteases. This enzyme is secreted by the pancreas and cleaved to its active form in the small intestine. It is active on peptide linkages involving the carboxyl group of lysine or arginine. This gene and several other trypsinogen genes are localized to the T cell receptor beta locus on chromosome 7. [provided by RefSeq, Jul 2008].

References

Further reading